Erigeron latus  is a rare species of flowering plant in the family Asteraceae known by the common name broad fleabane. It is native to the Great Basin of the western United States. The natural range is small but split between 3 counties  in 3 states: Malheur County in Oregon, Owyhee County in Idaho, and Elko County in Nevada.

Description
Erigeron latus  is a small perennial herb rarely more than 8 centimeters (0.8 inches) tall, producing a woody taproot. The leaves are mostly crowded around the base of the stem. Both the stem and the leaves are covered with stiff hairs. The plant generally produces only one flower head per stem, each head with up to 25 purple or pink ray florets surrounding numerous yellow disc florets.

References

Flora of the Great Basin
latus
Plants described in 1913
Flora without expected TNC conservation status